The Conners is an American sitcom television series created by Matt Williams for ABC as a spin-off continuation of the long-running series Roseanne. It stars John Goodman, Laurie Metcalf, Sara Gilbert, Lecy Goranson, Michael Fishman, Emma Kenney, Ames McNamara, Jayden Rey, Maya Lynne Robinson, and Jay R. Ferguson. The series premiered on October 16, 2018.

Series overview

Episodes

Season 1 (2018–2019)

Season 2 (2019–2020)

Season 3 (2020–2021)

Season 4 (2021–2022)

Season 5 (2022–2023)

Ratings

Season 1

Season 2

Season 3

Season 4

Season 5

References

External links
 
 

Lists of American sitcom episodes